The Homeowners’ Defense Act is a bill proposed in the House and Senate in the 111th United States Congress. The bill was proposed by Democratic Representative, Ron Klein of Florida. The purpose of the law, according to its sponsors, is to ensure availability of homeowners’ insurance for catastrophic events. The legislation would create a National Catastrophe Risk Consortium to monitor and regulate state insurance entities. The Consortium would also be able to issue securities and loans from the U.S. Treasury to provide capital to state-run insurers for catastrophe related risks. Previous forms of the bill were introduced in the House and Senate, including  (2007) (which passed in the House in 2007), but were never passed in both the House and Senate.

Support 

Members of both parties, the great majority of them from hurricane-prone areas, support the Homeowners' Defense Act. Supporters say that the bill would reduce insurance costs for consumers by helping create a national fund to help pool the risk associated with catastrophes. Many supporters, including Representative Ron Klein (D-FL), cite rising insurance costs and private insurance companies leaving the area as a sign that the private market for property insurance is not working, and thus the federal intervention and regulation is necessary. Private insurers, like State Farm, have also joined in support of the legislation saying that the private market alone has insufficient capacity to handle large catastrophic disaster coverage for homeowners. Supporters formed the coalition, ProtectingAmerica.

Opposition 

Opposition to the Homeowners’ Defense Act has come from very different sides including the national coalition, SmarterSafer, made up of environmental, free market, good government, and tax payer groups. Many environmental groups like the National Wildlife Federation were opposed to the bill because they believed it would encourage home construction in environmentally sensitive areas. Free-market and tax payer advocacy groups like the Heartland Institute were also in opposition to the legislation on grounds that it'd crowd-out the private insurance market and encourage building homes in risky, hurricane-prone areas.

References

External links
 H.R.2555 - The bill history of H.R.2555.
 ProtectingAmerica - Archived
 SmarterSafer - Archived

Health Insurance Act
Proposed legislation of the 111th United States Congress
Insurance in the United States